Ernest Arthur Thorne (7 June 1887 – 18 November 1968) was an English tug of war competitor who competed in the 1920 Summer Olympics representing Great Britain. In 1920 he won the gold medal as member of the British team, which was wholly composed of City of London Police officers.

References

External links
profile
Olympic profile

1887 births
1968 deaths
English Olympic medallists
Olympic tug of war competitors of Great Britain
Tug of war competitors at the 1920 Summer Olympics
Olympic gold medallists for Great Britain
Olympic medalists in tug of war
Medalists at the 1920 Summer Olympics
City of London Police officers